Adam Carter (born 17 April 1994) is a professional Australian rules football player who was listed with the West Coast Eagles in the Australian Football League (AFL). He was recruited by the club in the 2012 National Draft, with pick #59. Carter made his debut in Round 16, 2013, against  at Subiaco Oval.

Carter was delisted at the conclusion of the 2014 AFL season.

References

External links

1994 births
Living people
West Coast Eagles players
South Fremantle Football Club players
Australian rules footballers from Perth, Western Australia